Sham Ju (also Romanized as Sham‘ Jū) is a village in Sirik Rural District, Byaban District, Sirik County, Hormozgan Province, Iran. At the 2012 census, its population was 1,290, in 310 families.

References 

Populated places in Minab County